Reig may refer to:

 Alba Reig, a member of the music group Sweet California
 Andreu Blanes Reig (born 1991), Spanish orienteering competitor
 Ben Reig (died 1968), American fashion businessman
 Howard Reig (1921–2008), American radio and television announcer
 Òscar Ribas Reig, (1936–2020), Andorran politician, lawyer, and businessman
 Osvaldo Reig (1929–1992), Argentinian biologist and paleontologist
 Rafael Reig (born 1963), Spanish writer
 Rubén Reig (born 1986), Spanish racing cyclist
 Teddy Reig (1918–1984), American music producer and promoter
 Enrique Reig y Casanova (1858–1927), archbishop of Toledo and Primate of Spain
 Nelly Reig Castellanos (1929–2021), First Lady of Paraguay from 1989 to 1993
 Maria Reig Moles (born 1951), Andorran entrepreneur
 Julià Reig Ribó (1911–1996), Andorran politician
 Antoni Reig Ventura (born 1932), Valencian pilotari

See also
 Reig's grass mouse South American rodent
 Reig's montane mouse, Venezuelan rodent
 Reig's opossum, South American opossum
 Reig's tuco-tuco, Argentinian rodent